Richard "Rick" Mirabito is an American politician and businessman from Williamsport, PA.  He currently serves as a County Commissioner in Lycoming County.  He served three terms as a member of the Pennsylvania House of Representatives for the 83rd district.

Background

Mirabito was born in Sea Cliff, New York and graduated from North Shore High School in 1974. In 1987, Mirabito was on the court counsel for the Republic of Palau Supreme Court In 1989, Mirabito earned his Juris Doctor (J.D.) from Boston College Law School and moved to Williamsport to become a law clerk for United States District Judge Malcolm Muir.

Real Estate  
In March 1990, Mirabito started a real estate leasing company, Mirabito Properties, which currently leases real estate in 35 unique locations around Williamsport. In 1998, Mirabito co-founded the Williamsport Lycoming Landlord Association, collaborating with the City of Williamsport and Lycoming Housing. This organization seeks to "promote decent, safe, crime-free housing by educating and supporting landlords, improving rental property investment, and enhancing our community image."

He is a member of the College and Community Coalition organized by the Pennsylvania College of Technology and chairman of the Organization Committee of the Main Street project and was on the board of Our Towns 2010.

Political career 
Mirabito represented the 83rd District in the Pennsylvania House of Representatives for the 2009, 2011 and 2013 terms. Following an unsuccessful reelection bid for the 2015 term, Mirabito was elected to the Lycoming County Commission.

Personal life 
Mirabito is married to the former Sara M. Rider of Williamsport. They live in Cogan Station PA with their son, Rocco, and are members of St. Boniface Church.

References

External links

State Representative Rick Mirabito official caucus site
Rick Mirabito (D) official PA House site
Rick Mirabito for State Representative official campaign site

Living people
Democratic Party members of the Pennsylvania House of Representatives
1956 births
21st-century American politicians